.web is a proposed top-level domain (TLD) that was created and assigned by an auction process to several bidding companies. It was awarded to Nu Dot Co LLC, which is primarily funded by Verisign.

Auction
The right to operate the domain .web was won by Nu Dot Co LLC at an auction, which was primarily funded by market-dominant Verisign, for a price of $135 million. The ICANN auction of last resort that started on July 27, 2016, completed on July 28, 2016. ICANN will keep the proceeds from this auction. TLD .web will be added to the official root after ICANN awards the registry contract.

Seven companies were bidding for the right to operate .web:
Nu Dot Co LLC (Straat), funded by Verisign
Charleston Road Registry Inc. (Google)
Web.com Group, Inc.
DotWeb Inc.
Ruby Glen, LLC
Schlund Technologies GmbH (United Internet)
Afilias Domains No. 3 Limited

Delays 
Although Nu Dot Co LLC won the rights to operate the .web domain in 2016, the release of the domain has been postponed by a series of events.

The release of gTLD .web was initially postponed due to Ruby Glen, LCC. On August 8, 2016, they filed an amended complaint against ICANN, which began July 22, 2016. The major complaint was that Verisign planned to use Nu Dot Co LLC to acquire the .web domain. The complaint was dismissed on November 28, 2016. However, the dismissal was appealed on December 20, 2016.

The Antitrust Division of the U.S. Department of Justice opened an investigation concerning antitrust issues with ICANN on February 9, 2017. This investigation was closed on January 10, 2018.

On February 23, 2018, applicant Afilias, who was the second highest bidder, requested documents from ICANN.

On May 19, 2022, ICANN's BAMC (Board Accountability Mechanisms Committee) decided to ask the involved parties to rehash what has happened, by sending an official letter  in the form of an email to all the entities involved in the .web bidding.

Registry

 
.web was operated as a prospective registry, but never worked in the official root, by Image Online Design 1995. It originated when Jon Postel, then running the top level of the Domain Name System basically single-handedly, proposed the addition of new top-level domains to be run by different registries. Since internet tradition at the time emphasized "rough consensus and running code", Christopher Ambler, who ran Image Online Design, saw this as meaning that his company could get a new TLD into the root by starting up a functional registry for it. After asking and receiving permission from IANA to do so, IOD promoted web, but the TLD never worked on the internet as it failed to get ICANN approval.

Since then IOD tried and failed to get their domain into the official root through several plans to admit new top-level domains. Several new-TLD plans in the late 1990s, including Postel's original proposal, failed to reach sufficient consensus among the increasingly contentious factions of the Internet to admit any new TLDs, including .web. When ICANN accepted applications for new TLDs in 2000 which resulted in the seven new domains added soon afterward, IOD's application was not approved; all unapproved applications were rejected. A second round of new TLD assignments was conducted with new applications, and only for sponsored domains (generally intended for use by limited communities and run by nonprofit entities). The registry for .web remained hopeful, however, that their application will eventually be approved. On May 10, 2007, ICANN announced the opening of public comments towards a new, third round of new gTLDs, a round in which IOD did not participate. One of these new TLD applicants will prevail and operate the web TLD which will resolve on the internet.

At times IOD has claimed priority rights to the TLD string .web, although any legal basis for such a claim is questionable given that the United States Patent and Trademark Office has stated that top-level domains are not trademarkable in themselves. IOD does, however, have a registered trademark in the term "web". When, at various times, proposals were made to add a .web domain not operated by IOD, they have objected, and to date, no such plans have been approved; an application by Afilias to operate a web domain was turned down in favor of their running .info instead. Vint Cerf, then chair of ICANN, noted that he recognized IOD's pioneering work in web, and felt that web should be held in reserve for IOD's application in the next round rather than be awarded to Afilias, preferring that they receive .info instead. Afilias is one of the seven applicants who will eventually operate .web.

The IOD web registry has in the past accepted registrations, and intended to allow them to continue in force after entering the root, although some commentators feel that ICANN ought to require them to discard existing registrations and proceed with a startup procedure as with other new TLDs, so as not to grant any legitimacy to unofficial registrations. No previous web registrations will have legal claim when the TLD goes live.

On February 7, 2013, the United States District Court for the Central District of California approved a motion to dismiss the complaint from ICANN.

Some movies used web domains for fictional companies. For example, the film Next Day Air has advertised on one of their trucks the link www.nda.web. Skyfall advertises www.868000.web on the side of a taxi during a pursuit scene.

References

External links 
 Court ruling dismissing IOD .web case
 IRP Panel Dismisses Afilias' Claims to Reverse .WEB Auction and Award .WEB to Afilias

Proposed top-level domains

sv:Toppdomän#Generiska toppdomäner